The Northwest Hawaiʻi Times was a monthly newspaper based in Seattle, Washington that served the Hawaiian community in the Pacific Northwest. It was founded in April 2004, and ceased publication five years later (March 2009).

External links
http://www.northwesthawaiitimes.com

Newspapers published in Seattle